Perennial Divide was a British electronic music band, formed in 1986 by Jack Dangers, Jonny Stephens, Andy Ward, Paul Freegard and Steve Searley.  It was relatively short-lived; Dangers and Stephens left it in 1988 to form Meat Beat Manifesto.

Discography

Burndown 12" vinyl (1986)
"New Foundation of Mankind" – 5:51
"The Permanent Way" – 5:13

Purge LP (1986; only 2000 copies pressed)
"Blow" – 5:52
"Parricide" – 2:08
"Word of the Lord" – 4:18
"Captain Swing" – 4:29
"Rescue" – 4:56
"The Fall" – 5:32
"Trip" – 6:07
"Tuna Hell" – 1:51 
"Burning Dogs" – 3:47
"End of the Line" – 5:07

Beehead EP (1987)
"Bee Head" – 4:38 (produced by XTC's Andy Partridge)
"World Spread" – 5:27 (Produced by Johnny Pegg)
"Gentle as a Fawn Is Warm" – 4:05 (Produced by Johnny Pegg)
"Clamp" – 0:39 (Produced by Johnny Pegg)

Leathernecks (1988; test 12")
"Monster" – 5:59
"Leathernecks" – 3:58
(untitled) – 1:20

External links
 Digitalchemist.com
 Brainwashed.com

English electronic music groups
Wax Trax! Records artists